Vallentuna Municipality (Vallentuna kommun) is a municipality in Stockholm County in east central Sweden. Its seat is located in the town of Vallentuna.

The current municipality was established as a result of the municipal reform of 1971. Its coat of arms depicts an eagle, a broad axe and two stars.

Geography
The geography is still dominated by nature and agriculture and some lakes and streams, besides the urban areas. Many houses are one family houses.

Localities
The seat of the municipality is in Vallentuna, which is a contiguous built-up area, partly situated in Täby Municipality. There are also smaller localities, such as Brottby, Karby, Kårsta and Lindholmen.

Demography

Population development

Income and Education
The population in Vallentuna Municipality has the 12th highest median income per capita in Sweden, although the share of highly educated persons, according to Statistics Sweden's definition: persons with post-secondary education that is three years or longer, is 28.6% and slightly over the national average, 27.0%.

Residents with a foreign background
On the 31st of December 2017 the number of people with a foreign background (persons born outside of Sweden or with two parents born outside of Sweden) was 6 009, or 18.11% of the population (33 175 on the 31st of December 2017). On the 31st of December 2002 the number of residents with a foreign background was (per the same definition) 3 458, or 13.35% of the population (25 905 on the 31st of December 2002). On 31 December 2017 there were 33 175 residents in Vallentuna, of which 4 667 people (14.07%) were born in a country other than Sweden. Divided by country in the table below - the Nordic countries as well as the 12 most common countries of birth outside of Sweden for Swedish residents have been included, with other countries of birth bundled together by continent by Statistics Sweden.

Present
Vallentuna has been expanding in recent years, and is one of the municipalities of the county that grows fastest every year, with more than 2% yearly, and has now doubled since 1971. Many people settle in Vallentuna because it is close to nature, and yet allows them to commute to their work places, both in Stockholm (to where the commuter gets you in 30 minutes) and elsewhere. In total, about 9,000 people commute from Vallentuna to other municipalities, while about 2,000 people commute into Vallentuna.

Public transportation
The municipality is served by the Stockholm public transport system through SL. There are nine stops on the narrow gauge Roslagsbanan suburban railway as well as a bus network.

Schools and education
All over the central part of Vallentuna you can find schools of different sorts, there is a cultureschool (Kulturskolan) that specialises in teaching music but also drama, musical and dance. Vallentunas "Högstadie skolor" (aimed for kids ages 12–16) are Hjälmstaskolan, Vittra Vallentuna, Hammarbackskolan, Bällstabergsskolan and Vallentuna Friskola. There also is a Secondary School ("gymnasieskola"), Vallentuna Gymnasium.

Sports 
Vallentuna has two sports facilities; Vallentuna IP and Össeby IP. Vallentuna IP is a modern sports facility with track & field, soccer fields, ice hockey rinks, tennis courts and trail runs. Össeby IP has a track & field track, soccer field, trail runs, inside tennis courts, and an inside sports gym.

References

External links

Vallentuna Municipality - Official site

Municipalities of Stockholm County
Metropolitan Stockholm